Lound may refer to:

People 
Thomas Lound (1801–1861), British painter of landscapes

Places 
Lound, Lincolnshire, England
Lound, Nottinghamshire, England
Lound, Suffolk, England